Hubby Jenkins is an American multi-instrumentalist who studies and performs old-time American music. He is a former member of the Carolina Chocolate Drops and the Rhiannon Giddens band, and has been nominated for Grammy and Americana awards.

Biography 
Hubby Jenkins was born and raised in Brooklyn, New York. He attended PS 11 in Clinton Hills and Brooklyn Technical High School. As a young man, he played the saxophone and bass guitar. After discovering the music of Skip James and Bukka White, he began exploring how African Americans influenced American roots music.

Career 
Jenkins began performing as a busker in New York City, then booked gigs in local coffee shops and bars. From 2010 to 2016, Jenkins was a member of the Carolina Chocolate Drops, playing instruments including guitar, banjo, and bones. Their album Leaving Eden was nominated for a Grammy Award for Best Folk Album in 2012. Along with other members, he was later part of the Rhiannon Giddens band. The two groups played a major role in the revival of Black string band tradition.

Jenkins was nominated for Instrumentalist of the Year at the 2015 Americana Awards.

Discography

Albums

References

External links 
 
 

Year of birth missing (living people)
Living people
Musicians from Brooklyn
American multi-instrumentalists